Paul Berg (born 26 September 1991) is a German snowboarder, specializing in snowboard cross.

Berg competed at the 2014 Winter Olympics for Germany. In the snowboard cross, he won his 1/8 round race, but finished 4th in his quarterfinal, not advancing, and finishing 13th overall.

Berg made his World Cup debut in January 2012. As of September 2014, he has one World Cup victory, coming at La Molina in 2013–14. His best overall finish was 2nd, in 2013–14.

World Cup Podiums

References

External links
 
 
 

1991 births
Living people
Olympic snowboarders of Germany
Snowboarders at the 2014 Winter Olympics
Snowboarders at the 2018 Winter Olympics
Snowboarders at the 2022 Winter Olympics
People from Bergisch Gladbach
Sportspeople from Cologne (region)
German male snowboarders
21st-century German people